Halme is a Finnish surname. Notable people with the surname include:

Aatu Halme (1873-1933), Finnish construction worker, trade union functionary and politician
Juho Halme (1888–1918), Finnish athlete
Reijo Halme (1899–1941), Finnish sprinter
Viljo Halme (1907–1981), Finnish footballer
Pekka Halme (1927–2018), Finnish athlete.
Laila Halme (1934–2021), Finnish singer
Tony Halme (1963–2010), Finnish politician, professional wrestler, writer and actor
Jussi Halme (born 1980), Finnish ice hockey player
Jukka Halme (born 1985), Finnish footballer
Aapo Halme (born 1998), Finnish professional footballer

Finnish-language surnames